Walton and Frinton Lifeboat Station is an RNLI station located in the town of Walton-on-the-Naze in the English county of Essex. The current all-weather boat (AWB) at Walton is the Tamar Class Irene Muriel Rees (ON 1299) which is kept moored afloat in a specially constructed pen at the end of Walton Pier. Prior to the construction of this, the boats were anchored in open water to the south of the pier.

History

1884–1914: early years 
The RNLI station opened in 1884, with a 37-foot self-righting lifeboat called Honourable Artillery Company (ON 31) built by Forrest and Son of Limehouse. The lifeboat was paid by and named for the drama club of the Honourable Artillery Company, which had been stationed at Walton in 1860. The lifeboat was stationed in a purpose-built lifeboat house on northern end of the Walton seafront. This boathouse is now the home of the Walton Maritime Museum.

In 1894, disagreements between the RNLI crew and station committee led to some crew members resigning to set up a private lifeboat station in the town. For the next twenty years, Walton was covered by two lifeboats whose crews were in tense rivalry. 

In 1900 the Honourable Artillery Company was retired after 16 years of service. Her replacement was a Norfolk and Suffolk-class lifeboat called James Stevens No.14 (ON 432).

1914–1928: World War I and replacement lifeboats 
During World War I (1914 – 1918) the Walton lifeboat assisted both Allied and neutral vessels off the Essex coast. On 29 December 1917, the James Stevens was called out in a gale to assist the 780-ton SS Peregrine of London, which was stranded just off Clacton-on-Sea. After a lengthy search, the lifeboat located the Peregrine and rescued all 59 passengers and the chief steward. After dropping the passengers off, the lifeboat returned to the ship, which had broken in half, and saved the remaining 32 crew members. The rescue was not completed until 9 am on December 30. The James Stevens No.14 was badly damaged during the rescue, and her first and second coxswains were awarded RNLI Medals in Silver and Bronze, respectively.

James Stevens No.14 was at Walton for a total of 28 years. In 1928 she was replaced by a new Ramsgate-class lifeboat motor lifeboat named E.M.E.D. (ON 705).

1940–1977: Dunkirk evacuation and new lifeboats 
In May 1940, the E.M.E.D. was one of the Little Ships of Dunkirk which assisted in the Dunkirk evacuation early in World War II. She was commandeered and crewed by the Royal Navy for transporting soldiers on the beach to larger ships waiting offshore. Working inside Dunkirk harbour, E.M.E.D. survived three enemy air attacks off Gravelines, although a during one attack a shell killed the officer in charge of the lifeboat. Despite sustaining some damage during the operation, she was repaired and returned to Walton lifeboat station after the evacuation. In total, the E.M.E.D. lifeboat was launched a total of 57 times during the war and is credited with saving 20 lives.

In 1953 the station received a new 46 ft 9 in Watson class lifeboat called Edian Courtauld (ON 910) to replace E.M.E.D. The Edian was the last new-built lifeboat allocated to Walton until 2011. Built at a cost of £29,687, she was a gift from yachtsman and Arctic explorer Augustine Courtauld, and was named for his mother. Originally powered by twin Ferry VE4 diesels, these were replaced by 65 hp Parsons Barracuda engines in 1967. Edian Courtauld served at Walton until July 1977, launching on service 224 times and saving 143 lives.

In 1977, Edian Courtauld was replaced by a self-righting 48 ft 6 in Oakley-class boat, The Earl and Countess Howe (ON968), which had been built in 1963 at a cost of £40,348. Powered by twin Gardner 6LX 110 hp diesels, she had spent 14 years stationed at Yarmouth Lifeboat Station on the Isle of Wight before being transferred to Walton. The Earl and Countess Howe served at Walton until January 1984, launching on service 64 times and saving 21 lives.

1984–2005: lifeboat replacements and station work 

In 1984, The Earl and Countess Howe was retired and replaced by City of Birmingham (ON 1012), a 48 ft 6 in Solent-class lifeboat. The City of Birmingham launched to several of the Radio Ships moored off the Essex coast including to the Radio Caroline ship Ross Revenge. This lifeboat was stationed at Walton until August 1993 and during her service there she launched on service 186 times, saving 40 lives.

In 1993, the second prototype  lifeboat Sam and Joan Woods (ON 1075), built in 1982, was allocated to the station after spending nine years in the RNLI Relief Fleet. Sam and Joan Woods stayed at Walton for less than three years, launching on service 67 times and saving 10 lives, before being replaced in May 1996 by the 1989-built Tyne-class vessel Kenneth Thelwall II (ON1154). 

In 1998 work was carried out on the station facilities. 

In 2005 the station was once again improved with a new berth and wave break constructed alongside the pier, allowing quicker and safer boarding response times. The work was cost around £1 million. The new wave break was officially opened on 1 May 2005 by the RNLI's Chief of Operations Michael Vlasto.

2011: Irene Muriel Rees 

Kenneth Thelwall II served at Walton until May 2011, when the station received its first brand new lifeboat since 1953, the Tamar-class Irene Muriel Rees (ON 1299). The lifeboat was built at a cost of £2.5 million, funded from the legacy of Irene Muriel Rees.

Lifeboats

Geographic location of neighbouring stations

References 

Lifeboat stations in Essex
Walton-on-the-Naze